In Indonesia, the rural car or the village car (mobil desa) is a grouping of cars that appeared after the second reshuffle of the Joko Widodo's cabinet in July 2016. The reshuffle replaced the Minister of Industry to Airlangga Hartarto. President Jokowi gave the mandate to develop the Small Medium Industry (SMI) project and rural cars. This program was initiated by the Ministry of Industry together with the Indonesian Automotive Institute (IOI). The fixed price for a rural car is around Rp60–80 million, cheaper than Kendaraan Bermotor Roda Empat Hemat Energi dan Harga Terjangkau (also called KBH2 or LCGC). Rural cars can only be used on off-road roads and village roads outside the toll road. Rural vehicles are designed to facilitate community activities in the area with their function as a means of transporting agricultural and plantation products.

Specifications 
Ministry of Industry stipulates that cars that can be classified as rural cars are those that meet the following specifications:

 The form does not intersect with the vehicle of that era. Assuming dimensions of length × width × height (3.2 m × 1.5 m × 1.8 m plus trailer).
 Vehicle configuration can be 4×4 or 4×2.
 Diesel engine with a capacity of 1,000 cc, can be powered by biofuel (biodiesel).
 Vehicle speed of 50 km/hour.
 The selling price is around Rp60 million on the road.
 Vehicles with simple maintenance concepts and systems.
 The design or shape of the body and cabin has a characteristic or patterned local wisdom.
 The vehicle platform uses frames that are simple and easily assembled.
 The body and cabin are easy to disassemble and with local materials, that must be lightweight and strong.
 Minimum ground clearance of 200 mm.
 In general, this vehicle is easily assembled.
 The vehicle shape design must be multipurpose (for agriculture, plantations, animal husbandry, irrigation, fisheries, fishermen, etc.).
 As a means of transporting people and goods.

See also 

 Low cost green car
 Kei car
 Panda car

References

External links 

 Ministry of Industry Completes Rural Car Concept

Road transport in Indonesia
Transport economics